Magdalena Álvarez de Seminario (born 10 May 1920) is an Argentine politician. She was elected to the Chamber of Deputies in 1951 as one of the first group of female parliamentarians in Argentina.

Biography
In the 1951 legislative elections she was a Female Peronist Party candidate in Buenos Aires Province and was one of the 26 women elected to the Chamber of Deputies. She remained in office until the Chamber was dissolved as a result of the Revolución Libertadora in September 1955.

References

1920 births
Living people
Argentine centenarians
Buenos Aires Province politicians
Justicialist Party politicians
Members of the Argentine Chamber of Deputies elected in Buenos Aires Province
Women members of the Argentine Chamber of Deputies
20th-century Argentine politicians
20th-century Argentine women politicians